Love Radio is a broadcast FM radio network in the Philippines owned by Manila Broadcasting Company. Its headquarters are located at Cultural Center of the Philippine Complex, Pasay, Manila. The network's original format is easy-listening until 2000 when Love Radio shifted to Contemporary MOR or more popularly known as the masa format.

Its flagship station is DZMB in Metro Manila (licensed to Cebu Broadcasting Company), which has been rated as #1 in the FM radio ratings for 15 years (from 2002 to 2017), according to the KBP's Radio Research Council Surveys and AC Nielsen Car Survey.

History
Love Radio was previously known by its call letters DZMB (Previously broadcasting under call letters KZRH back in 1949) when it began broadcasts on the FM band in 1975 from its first broadcast days on the AM band. Back then, it played mainstream pop, later relegating to easy listening music. As DZMB, it also introduced and institutionalized the deep-voiced radio announcers. In the 1980s, Manuelito F. Luzon, then station manager of DZMB, conceptualized the station's branding identity.

In the 2000s, Love Radio was reformatted to a contemporary masa, a format that was trending on the landscape of FM radio in the country which was started by rival stations since the dawn of the new millennium.

Roster

DJs
As of January 16, 2023: 
 Tanya Chinita
 Angkol Dagol
 Chris Tsuper
 Nicole Hyala
 Robin Sienna
 Conyo Bicolano
 Raqi Terra
 Diego Bandido
 Totoy Bato
 Lala Banderas

Former DJs

 Papa Jack  (2007-2016; now with 106.7 Energy FM as Papa Jackson)
 Kara Karinyosa (now with 106.7 Energy FM as DJ Kara)
 Robin Sienna 1
 Lyka Barista (assigned to 101.1 Yes The Best)
 Kristine Dera (2008-2018; now with Win Radio as Mama Colleen)
 Lloyd Cadena (deceased)
 Laboching (2019-2022; now with ABS-CBN and TV5)
 Rico Panyero (assigned to 101.1 Yes The Best) 
 Rica Herra
 Missy Hista
 Emma Harot
 Malaya Macaraeg
 DJ Aira
 DJ Caren (assigned to 101.1 Yes The Best)
 Shai Tisay (assigned to 96.3 Easy Rock as Shai)
 Sexy Terry
 Rey Porter
 Matthew Dancer
 Monsour Betero
 Tommy Tambay
 Bobby Guard

Programming

90.7 Love Radio Manila
All programs airing from Monday to Friday, may or may not be viewable on the station's Facebook and YouTube live broadcasts; data as of March 5, 2023:

Saturday & Sunday - Music Automation (all day)

Love Radio stations

See also
Manila Broadcasting Company

References

 
Philippine radio networks
Mass media companies established in 1975
Radio stations established in 1975
1975 establishments in the Philippines